The Taiwan Salt Museum is a museum about salt in Cigu District, Tainan, Taiwan.

History
The salt mountain was once the largest sea salt field in Taiwan supplying the domestic demand. Due to the declining demand, the salt field ceased production in May 2002. After the production halt, the place was refurbished by Taiyen Company to create a unique landscape of salt mountain.

Architecture
The shape and the look of the salt piles are strategically designed so that the two piles look like two white pyramids rising out of the salt field.

Exhibitions
The museum displays salt-related products as well as collection of books and relics about the salt industry in Taiwan.

Transportation
The museum is accessible by bus from Tainan or Xinying Station.

See also
 List of museums in Taiwan

References

Museums with year of establishment missing
Food museums in Taiwan
Industry museums in Taiwan
Museums in Tainan
Salt museums